No. 654 Squadron AAC (654 Sqn) was a squadron of the British Army's Army Air Corps (AAC).

History

The squadron was formed on 1 September 1958 in Germany and employed as 2 Division Aviation HQ between 1964 and October 1969.

Between February and March 1991 the squadron was in Iraq as part of Operation Desert Sabre (the ground phase of Operation Granby) using Westland Lynx AH1GT's against armoured vehicles of the Iraqi 12th Armoured Division. They returned to Hobart Barracks on 22 March 1991 without any losses.

Deployments

 Operation Herrick (Afghanistan):
 September 2008 – January 2009
 September 2010 – January 2011
 January 2012 – May  2012
 September 2013 – January 2014

Aircraft operated
The squadron operated a variety of helicopters:
 Saunders-Roe Skeeter AOP.12
 Westland Sioux AH.1
 Westland Lynx AH.1GT
 Westland Scout AH.1
 AgustaWestland Apache AH.1

Locations
 Tofrek Barracks East, Hildesheim
 Harewood Barracks, Herford
 Hobart Barracks, Detmold

See also

 List of Army Air Corps aircraft units

References

Citations

Bibliography

External links

Army Air Corps aircraft squadrons
Military units and formations established in 1958
Military units and formations disestablished in 2014
1958 establishments in the United Kingdom